The Bernard 190 or Bernard-Hubert 190 was a French airliner of 1928.  It was a high-wing cantilever monoplane of conventional configuration, based on the Bernard 18. Compared with its predecessor, it kept the same basic design but featured redesigned tail surfaces, an enlarged cabin, and offered its flight crew a completely enclosed cockpit. Also like its predecessor, the basic airliner model provided the basis for a long-range aircraft to be used in record attempts, the 191GR (for Grand Raid).

Operational history
The eight 190Ts entered service in 1929 with CIDNA, operating on various European routes. The 190T was not popular with CIDNA, whose president had been trying for several years to purchase more efficient and economical Fokker F.VIIs. The last 190T was burnt on 3 January 1933.  

The 190 is best remembered for the exploits of the three 191GRs. The first built was used by Louis Coudouret in an attempt to cross the North Atlantic in August 1928. This was unsuccessful when the aircraft first refused to leave the ground in Paris, and was later turned back by Spanish authorities unwilling to permit the flight.  On 7 July 1929, Coudouret crashed the aircraft near Angoulême and was killed.

The second example was used in the first successful French aerial crossing of the North Atlantic.  Painted bright yellow and dubbed Oiseau Canari ("Canary Bird") it departed Old Orchard Beach, Maine on June 13, 1929 and piloted by Jean Assolant, René Lefèvre and Armand Lotti, it completed the crossing to Oyambre Beach, near Comillas, Cantabria, Spain, in 29 hours 52 minutes, even with a stowaway (Arthur Schreiber) aboard. This aircraft is now preserved in the Musée de l'Air et de l'Espace.

Variants
190TSingle-engined airliner, powered by a  Gnome et Rhône 9Ady (licence-built Bristol Jupiter) radial piston engine.

191TA single aircraft powered by a  Hispano-Suiza 12Lb V-12 engine.

191GRRecord-breaking aircraft, powered by  Hispano-Suiza 12Lb piston engine. Three built as 191G.R. No.1, 191G.R. No.2 and 191G.R. No.3.

192TSingle mailplane example for Aéropostale, powered by a  Gnome & Rhône 9Akx radial engine.

193TSingle-engined transport aircraft, powered by a  Lorraine 12Eb piston engine. Only one built.

197GREngine demonstrator commissioned by Lorraine-Dietrich. Lost off Rangoon 26 February 1929.

Operators

Aéropostale
CIDNA

Specifications (190T)

References

Bibliography

Further reading

 
 
 

190
1920s French airliners
Single-engined tractor aircraft
High-wing aircraft
Aircraft first flown in 1928